Alnwick railway station was the terminus of the Alnwick branch line, which diverged from the East Coast Main Line at Alnmouth in  Northumberland, Northern England. The branch fully opened on 19 August 1850 but was used by a special train on 6th August. It closed for passengers in January 1968 and completely in October 1968. The station was also the terminus of the Cornhill branch line to Coldstream which closed for passengers in 1930.

History

The first station on the edge of the town opened in 1850. It was replaced by a station nearer the town centre opened in 1887 by the North Eastern Railway. It became part of the London and North Eastern Railway during the Grouping of 1923. The station then passed on to the North Eastern Region of British Railways on nationalisation in 1948.

The station was closed by the British Railways Board in 1968. The platforms have been in-filled, but the trainshed remains intact and in use, including by Barter Books. The bookshop was featured in Michael Portillo's Great British Railway Journeys (first broadcast on BBC2, 23rd January 2012) and Tim Dunn's The Architecture the Railways Built (first broadcast on Yesterday, 25th October 2021)

References

Sources
 
 
 
   
 
 
 
 The station on navigable O.S. map

External links
 Alnwick station on navigable 1947 O. S. map
 Disused Stations: Alnwick Station

Alnwick
Disused railway stations in Northumberland
Former North Eastern Railway (UK) stations
Railway stations in Great Britain opened in 1850
Railway stations in Great Britain closed in 1968
1850 establishments in England
1968 disestablishments in England
William Bell railway stations